Coveney is a village northwest of Ely in Cambridgeshire. 

But the droves across Ely West Fen, by Frogs Abbey, to Downham Hythe, and from Wardy Hill to Witcham have recently been made up for wheeled traffic.

The Church of England parish church of St Peter ad Vincula is a Grade I listed building.

Several artefacts from the late Bronze Age have been found here, including bronze axes, shields and a few swords.

References

External links

Villages in Cambridgeshire
Civil parishes in Cambridgeshire
East Cambridgeshire District